Frederick II (9 July 1857 – 9 August 1928) was the last sovereign Grand Duke of Baden, reigning from 1907 until the abolition of the German monarchies in 1918. The Weimar-era state of Baden originated from the area of the Grand Duchy. In 1951–1952, it became part of the new state of Baden-Württemberg.

Life
Friedrich "Fritz" Wilhelm Ludwig Leopold August Prinz von Baden was born on 9 July 1857, in Karlsruhe in the state of Baden-Württemberg to Frederick I, Grand Duke of Baden and Princess Louise of Prussia.

As a student at the University of Heidelberg, Frederick was a member of the Suevia Corps, a student fraternal organization. Frederick became the head of the House of Zähringen on 28 September 1907, after the death of his father Frederick I, who was the sovereign Grand Duke of Baden reigning from 1856 to 1907. He abdicated on 22 November 1918, amidst the tumults of the German Revolution of 1918–19 which resulted in the abolition of the Grand Duchy. After the death of his cousin Carola of Vasa, he became the representative of the descent of the Kings of Sweden of the House of Holstein-Gottorp. On 20 September 1885 in Schloss Hohenburg, he married Princess Hilda of Nassau, the only daughter of the exiled Duke Adolphe of Nassau who later succeeded as Grand Duke of Luxembourg. There was no surviving issue from the marriage.

He was à la suite the Royal Prussian Regiments Erstes Garde-Regiment zu Fuß (1st Guard Foot Regiment) and 1. Garde-Ulanen-Regiment and à la suite the Imperial 1st Seebataillon. He was also Regimentschef of the 4. Königlich Sächsisches Infanterie-Regiment Nr. 103, which was also known as Infanterie-Regiment „Großherzog Friedrich II. von Baden“ (4. Königlich Sächsisches) Nr. 103.

Promotions

 1875 : Sekondeleutnant (= Leutnant)
 1881 : Premierleutnant (= Oberleutnant)
 1882 : Hauptmann
 1884 : Major
 1889 : Oberst
 1891 : Generalmajor
 1893 : Generalleutnant
 1897 : General der Infanterie
 1905 : Generaloberst with the rank of Generalfeldmarschall

Death
After his death in 1928, the headship of the house was transferred over to his first cousin who was the last Chancellor of Imperial Germany, Prince Maximilian of Baden.

Honours and awards 
German orders and decorations

Foreign orders and decorations
   Austria-Hungary:
 Grand Cross of the Royal Hungarian Order of St. Stephen, 1885
 Military Jubilee Cross, 14 August 1908
 : Grand Cordon of the Order of Leopold
 : Grand Cross of the Southern Cross
 : Knight of the Elephant, 13 October 1897
 : Knight of the Annunciation, 10 September 1897
 : Grand Cross of the Netherlands Lion
 :
 Grand Cross of the Order of Carol I, with Collar
 Grand Cross of the Star of Romania
 : Knight of St. Andrew
   Sweden-Norway:
 Knight of the Seraphim, with Collar, 20 September 1881
 Grand Cross of St. Olav, 27 September 1897
 : Honorary Grand Cross of the Royal Victorian Order, 16 June 1905
Honorary military appointments
 Honorary General of the Swedish Army, 1906

Ancestry

References

External links 
 Frederick II, Grand Duke of Baden in Stadtwiki Karlsruhe (City wiki of Karlsruhe), German

 
 

 
 
 

 

 

House of Zähringen
Protestant monarchs
Nobility from Karlsruhe
1857 births
1928 deaths
Heidelberg University alumni
Grand Dukes of Baden
Hereditary Princes of Baden
Monarchs who abdicated
Colonel generals of Prussia
19th-century Prussian military personnel
Grand Crosses of the Order of Saint Stephen of Hungary
Annulled Honorary Knights Grand Cross of the Royal Victorian Order
Military personnel from Karlsruhe